Mühlhausen-Ehingen is a town in the district of Konstanz in Baden-Württemberg in Germany.

Twin towns
Mühlhausen-Ehingen is twinned with:

  Domène, France, since 1997

References

Konstanz (district)
Hegau